Indomyrlaea is a genus of snout moths described by Rolf-Ulrich Roesler and Peter Victor Küppers in 1979. It contains the species Indomyrlaea auchmodes described by Alfred Jefferis Turner in 1905. It is known from Australia.

References

Phycitini
Monotypic moth genera
Moths of Australia
Pyralidae genera